This article contains character information for the American television sitcom Home Improvement.

Taylor family

Tim Taylor 

Timothy "Tim" Taylor (Tim Allen) – Tim Taylor (born October 1954) is the father of the family. Ever the know-it-all, Tim believes he has an incredibly wide knowledge of tools, electronics and general mechanics. In reality, he is highly accident-prone. He actually does have a significant amount of skill as a general handyman but can be overly confident and prone to spectacular mishaps. He often forgets a crucial step, ignores instructions, makes ill-advised modifications or comes to inaccurate conclusions. The only exception to this ineptitude is when working on cars, at which he excels. He is left-handed but actually does a great deal of his work with his right hand. 

Taylor's "arch enemy", so to speak, is the real-life home improvement specialist, Bob Vila. One episode sees Tim competing against Bob Vila in a lawnmower contest for charity. Tim installs a jet engine on his machine, which results in Tim causing unintended chaos and destruction. Tim hosts a home improvement show called Tool Time with his co-host and friend, Al Borland. While Al is his co-host, Al constantly must remind Tim of safety regulations and practices. Tim often ignores Al's advice and this frequently results in an accident. 

While it is constantly mentioned that Tool Time is a limited local home improvement show that sits very high on the channel dial, it seems to have a very wide audience in the state of Michigan and is progressively broadcast to more outlets across the Midwest (A season 5 episode has Tim, Al and Bud brainstorming for ideas on how to bring the show into the Chicago markets). Tim often boasts of his popularity for hosting the show, although many people state that they like Al better. A running gag involves people encountering Tim in public and stating, "Oh, we always watch Tool Time. We love Al." To which an annoyed Tim sarcastically replies, "Oh, yeah, we all love Al." In later seasons, however, it is learned that Tim actually has a higher fan base than Al (except in a Season 8 episode, where Al scores higher than Tim on a popularity poll).

Because of the numerous accidents in which he is involved, both on his TV show and at home, it is a recurring joke that Tim is on a first-name basis with the hospital staff, and it is often suggested that Tim has special offers available to him for being a repeat customer. Another gag is that Tool Time fans believe his many accidents are staged to show people what not to do. However, many of Tim's modified inventions work but are often too powerful, like his new ice cube dispenser, his leaf sucker machine, his gas-powered wheelchair and his gas-powered garbage disposal. 

Tim often garbles advice he heard from Wilson or otherwise makes ignorant remarks – although in one episode Tim stuns Jill and Wilson by putting forth sound advice of his own. Another running gag is Tim accidentally causing damage or destruction to anything he touches, such as destroying the world's smallest car or running over golf carts with a Marine Corps tank. Tim has an unhealthy obsession with Halloween and Christmas, going to extraordinary lengths to scare others and competing with "Doc Johnson" in the annual neighborhood Christmas lighting contest, which he only won once, although it was more a victory for the boys as they did the decorating while Tim was out of town. He is also injured every year while working on the Christmas decorations.

While Tim has a very good relationship with his wife, he is quick to admit defeat in any conflict they become engaged in. He also works hard to maintain healthy relationships with his three sons, although he relates more closely to Brad than Randy or Mark.

Tim is occasionally chauvinistic in attitude, usually putting women down or sometimes seeing them as inferior (but he often must absorb the same insults against men from Jill). A running gag is that every time Tim says something sexist on Tool Time, Al holds up a sign displaying the show's mailing address (or in one episode, the phone number) for the women to send in their complaints. He also tends to mock those who are overweight, such as Al's mother or his mother-in-law (until she loses weight) and can be juvenile in attitude on many occasions. Another running gag involves Jill's distaste for his attitude, in that she says "You're pathetic" every time he goes too far.

Tim is an avid fan of all the local sports teams: the Lions, the Pistons, the Red Wings and the Tigers. Many of the plot lines involve the teams and often wears their memorabilia. He is also a big fan of boxing, the Indy Racing League and tractor pulls. Many scenes take place in the garage while he is engaged in his favorite hobby, working on one of his two hot rods, one he built from the ground up and the other an existing vehicle that he restored.

While he occasionally considers moving on professionally, Tim remains the main host of Tool Time until the final episode of Home Improvement. Before he was cast on Tool Time, he worked as a traveling tool salesman. Tim barely graduated from college but later receives an honorary Doctorate from Western Michigan University. He often voices apelike grunts in a range of tones and inflections to convey emotions for comic effect, such as confusion, irritation or pride.

His mother is alive for the entire series; however, his father died when Tim was eleven years old. There has always been some disparity between how many brothers Tim has. On several occasions in the later seasons, it is mentioned that Tim has four brothers, but in earlier seasons he is stated to have five. However, seven have been mentioned by name (Marty, Jeff, Rick, John, Steve, Brian, and Danny). Marty and Jeff (and possibly others) made appearances, and Steve was mentioned in multiple seasons.

Tim always thinks things need "more power" and is often seen wearing sweaters from Michigan-based colleges. Tim thinks he knows everything there is to know about tools. He is also very connected to his tools, even once joking that when he dies he would like to be buried with them.

Tim is the only character to appear in every single episode. A close second is Jill, who only missed the second part of the series finale (unless one counts the flashbacks shown).

Tim appears in the Last Man Standing ninth season episode "Dual Time". It is mentioned that Tim still works with tools like he used to but that he did not want to do his show Tool Time any more and that his neighbor Wilson died.

Jill Taylor 

Jillian "Jill" Taylor (Patricia Richardson) – Jill (born November 1956) is Tim's wife and the mother of Brad, Randy, and Mark. Jill graduated from Adams High School (taken from an actual high school in Rochester Hills, Michigan) in 1973. Jill is intelligent, practical, and has a dry sense of humor that doesn't often fly with her family. At the series beginning, she struggles to reenter the workforce after a long absence but soon lands a job at a local magazine. After being let go from the magazine and reassessing her career choices, Jill goes back to school to earn her master's degree in psychology. 

While she is very motherly and domestic in nature, the show features recurring jokes about her poor cooking skills. She takes a keen interest in her children's activities including Randy's showmanship and Brad's soccer playing but seems closest to her youngest son, Mark, as the oldest two seem to prefer their father's interests of sports and cars while Mark remains more responsive to other activities.

Jill's father was a Colonel in the US Army and she sometimes laments the many moves she had to make while growing up. She has five sisters: Katie, Robin, Carrie, Tracy, and Linda. (A sixth sister, Carol, was mentioned in "Maybe, Baby" after just having a baby girl, but never again.) 

Jill has a strong feminist side and enjoys opera, theatre, and the ballet. She occasionally tries to be interested in her husband's hobbies including sports, cars, and tools, but often struggles to understand their basics. Jill also likes to "match-make", with mixed results. She set up Al with Ilene, who were together for a few seasons, and Wilson and one of her professors, who seemed to have a more successful relationship.

Brad Taylor 
Bradley Michael "Brad" Taylor (Zachery Ty Bryan) – (born January 1981) is the oldest, most athletic, and strongest of the three boys, once seen throwing Randy around when they got into an argument. While all three boys are portrayed as troublemakers at one point or another, Brad gets into the most serious trouble. He had a run-in with the police after throwing bricks at windows in an abandoned greenhouse, and was once discovered in possession of marijuana, which he admitted to smoking. 

On the other hand, Brad was the only Taylor son to co-host an episode of Tool Time, and the one seen doing the most extensive work on Tim's Hot Rod, and is the son to which Tim relates to the easiest. Although he often struggled with his school work, he has extraordinary athletic ability, especially playing soccer. Throughout the series, he was offered numerous opportunities to make a career out of soccer, including the offer to play for a professional team in England (the fictitious Birmingham Chubbs). This was rejected when his parents refused to allow him to give up college to play professional soccer. Later in the series, despite a knee injury which threatened to put an end to his athletic pursuits, he earned a college scholarship to UCLA. Brad has a prominent attraction to women, including his mild infatuation with Tool Times Heidi Keppert. Brad and Tim enjoy working on classic cars.

Brad got along well with Randy, especially early on in the show. The two are often seen working together to tease Mark, attempting to cover up Brad's actions to keep him out of trouble, or just hanging out together. Brad and Mark don't share many things in common until they get older, especially in the 8th season where they develop a close bond while Randy is away in Costa Rica.

Randy Taylor 
Randall William "Randy" Taylor (Jonathan Taylor Thomas) – Randy (born February 8, 1982) is the middle child, ultimately the smartest of the three boys, and frequently the most mischievous and especially sarcastic troublemaker. Randy's intelligence eventually led to him skipping ahead to advanced math and science classes, and was often the cause of sibling rivalry with Brad. Randy inherited Tim's talents as a jokester. Randy in the later seasons is noticeably a lot shorter than his brothers and his height is often made fun of by Brad. Whenever Tim was in trouble with Jill, Randy was always there with a quick remark that would almost always get him in trouble. 

Although initially sharing mostly the same interests as Brad and his father, throughout his adolescence Randy became very conscious about the environment and civil rights and became a vegetarian in later seasons. He wrote for the school newspaper, where he concentrated on social and political issues, including criticizing Binford for its pollution record, which led to a fierce disagreement with Tim and Tim's boss. Unlike Brad who dated many different girls, Randy, for the most part, only dated one girl, Lauren, whom he remained with for the rest of the series.

Randy is generally the most level-headed son in the family, although because he is an intelligent boy, he was also prone to arrogance, jealousy, cynicism, and sometimes a little prejudice. His father has a tendency to dislike and mock anything he has no interest in, such as ballet and opera, and Randy inherited this attitude, which ironically puts him at odds with Tim, since Randy has no interest in cars and tools. Out of all the Taylor boys, Randy is the one with the least respect for his father. He once called his father's show "Fool Time", and compared his father to an ape. When Tim brought Brad onto Tool Time, Randy immediately called it a stupid show and acted hateful towards Tim and Brad. 

During high school, he wrote a school article that turned many adults against Tim for Binford's pollution record, threatening his father's reputation, and he bitterly disapproved of Brad's jockish article earning the paper's front page, which was usually occupied by Randy's articles. He does however mend his relationships with them after learning the error of his ways. Unlike Tim and Brad, Randy is not good with his hands and does not enjoy working on crafts or the Hot Rod. Instead, he often relates more with his mother, with whom he shares his intelligence and enjoyment of acting.

In the Eighth Season of the show, Randy leaves for Costa Rica (along with Lauren, who stayed in a nearby town), reappearing in only one episode when he came back for Christmas. On that occasion, Randy felt that so much had changed in his absence that he no longer fit in with the family, although confiding in Wilson aided his feelings.

Early on in the show, Brad and Randy were portrayed as "partners in crime". While they did argue like normal brothers, they generally bonded over their mutual enjoyment of teasing Mark. As they got older, they grew apart somewhat, as Randy became more focused on school and social issues and Brad became more focused on athletics and girls.

Early on Randy and Mark generally only get along when united against Brad, though things improved somewhat as they got older.

Mark Taylor 
Marcus Jason "Mark" Taylor (Taran Noah Smith) – Mark (born March 1985) is the youngest and most sensitive of the three boys. He relates very closely with his mother, especially after the first season. He does not share many interests with his brothers or father, and in the early seasons was often the victim due to his naïveté of some practical joke that Brad and Randy had thought up on the spot for him. Mark is not a troublemaker, as he doesn't possess a joking demeanor or even a hint of a mean streak. On the rare occasions that Brad or Randy include him on pranks, Mark often blows their cover by responding to someone when he is not supposed to or divulging too much information. This divulging of information gets not only Brad and Randy in trouble but often Tim as well, especially when he is trying to keep something he said or did from Jill. 

During adolescence, Mark began to adopt a more goth look and an anti-establishment kind of attitude, the cause of which was founded in his feelings of social isolation. While Mark's darkening demeanor worried Tim and Jill on several occasions, it never turned into anything extremely destructive, although a homemade horror movie he created was a bit more twisted than they expected. His gothic appearance was gone by the end of the series. Mark enjoys film production and music, took karate and pilot training, and becomes a proficient cook. During the early seasons of the show, Mark is seen in a Cub Scout uniform without badges.

Mark's relationship with Brad and Randy was often adversarial, especially in early seasons because he was often the butt of their jokes, pranks and teasing. While Mark never truly bonded with Randy, in the final season Mark and Brad grew very close as the result of the dynamic of their relationship changing when Randy left for Costa Rica. Mark eventually became taller than Randy in the seventh season.

Marty Taylor 
Martin "Marty" Taylor (William O'Leary) – Marty (born in 1964) is Tim's youngest brother by ten years. As their father died when Marty was just one year old, Tim is the closest thing he knows to a father. Marty was often picked on by his older brothers, much as Mark is by Brad and Randy. He is often seen bouncing from job to job, unable to hold a steady career. For the majority of the show's run, Marty was married to Nancy (Jensen Daggett), and they had identical twin girls, Gracie and Claire. Marty and Nancy separated in season 8. He has his share of sarcastic quips and can be just as clueless as Tim.

Jeff Taylor 
Jeffrey "Jeff" Taylor (Thom Sharp) – Jeff is Tim and Marty's oldest brother (exact age unspecified). He is extremely frugal and suffers from male-pattern baldness, both of which make him a frequent target of Tim's jokes. Like Marty, Jeff has trouble maintaining a steady job. It is mentioned that he has made a number of bad business ventures (such as a drive-thru pet store), was divorced twice, and didn't finish college (as mentioned by Jill's sister in one episode). Jeff eventually makes an investment in Tim's hardware store.

Friends of the family

Al Borland 

Albert E. "Al" Borland (Richard Karn) – A master plumber and licensed contractor, Al is Tim's un-hip co-host on the show-within-a-show Tool Time and best friend. His personality is an exact opposite of Tim's – he is reserved, quiet, does not show much enthusiasm and has a wide array of professional knowledge concerning tools. Al made frequent suggestions that he should be the host of Tool Time instead of Tim. Al does not make as much money as Tim; in fact it is implied that his salary is not very big at all. In the episode, "Brothers and Sisters", Al says that he gets a very small paycheck. In the episode, "Fifth Anniversary", it is revealed that a big reason why Al was chosen to be Tim's assistant was because Al was the only assistant applicant that was willing to work for the salary that was offered. 

Al could be characterized as a "mama's boy"; he spent a great deal of time attempting to please his mother Alma – who was severely overweight (though she was never seen). She died from a heart attack near the end of the series after Al asked her permission to marry Trudy. His father was almost 60 when Al was born. Al was engaged to an orthodontist named Ilene for a time, but they ended up calling off the wedding. He also dated Greta Post who appeared a few times in the series. In a later season, Al met a wealthy exterminator named Trudy. They hit it off and were married on the show's final episode. Al might have been based on Norm Abram of This Old House because of the resemblance (flannel shirts, beard, portly, etc.) and the fact that Al does all the "real work" on the Tool Time show (much like Norm did on This Old House). 

Al has a big brother named Cal who is a physicist, and unlike most male siblings, they had never gotten into a physical fight. Instead, they usually settled their disputes over a cup of tea. In a flashback episode of the Tool Time premiere, Al was noted to be a Pisces and had a clean-shaven face, while Tim had a beard. Al has his own fan club. Like Tim, Al is left-handed and his favorite board games are Parcheesi, Chinese Checkers, Scrabble and Bingo. His favorite movie is My Fair Lady. One episode had a pet of Al's, a turtle named "Scooter," which Tim accidentally dropped in cement. With his dry wit, Al serves as the show's (both Tool Time and Home Improvement)  straight-forward, practical man to the wackier, more outgoing Tim. Beginning at the end of the fifth season, Al invented a second source of income for himself by inventing a board game based on Tool Time, which features Tim, Al and Heidi as playable characters.

Family, fashion sense, and career 
Borland is slightly overweight and is almost always seen wearing flannel, which Tim cracks jokes about consistently. The reason he always wears flannel came from his father, who, when asking young Al to assist in their own various home projects, would put his old flannels on Al to keep him clean or warm. Al wears flannel as a tribute to him after he died.

Tim also often pokes fun at Al's mother, Alma Borland, who is never seen (except her hand and forearm, in season 8) but is apparently severely overweight. In one of the later episodes, Al announces to his mother he is getting married. Immediately afterwards, she screams, passes out, and dies (she was holding a breadstick, which was all that was seen). When hearing the news, the breadstick shook violently and fell over. The coffin, shown at her funeral, is double-wide to keep the humorous tone.

Al also has a brother, Cal, who looks and dresses almost exactly like him, though he is a physicist ("Sisters and Brothers"). In the episode commentaries featured on the Season 1 DVD set, the executive producers reveal that "Cal" was a fan from Texas who sent his photo in a fan letter. Upon seeing his resemblance to Al, the producers brought him in to be Al's brother, Cal.

When Al was younger, he took fencing in school and served in the Navy as a Lt (j.g.) with the Seabees, and although he wanted to see the world, he was stationed in Fallon, Nevada (In the episode where Al mentions this, he uses the shibboleth pronunciation of "Nevada", pronouncing as a native would: Nev-ADD-ah rather than Nev-ODD-ah. This is uncommon for an outsider, especially someone living in the Midwest). After finishing his military service, Al was a construction crane operator (AFL–CIO Local 324), then apparently got certified as a master plumber and carpenter before getting the job on Tool Time. Al drives a 1984 Mercury Colony Park station wagon (mistakenly identified as a Mercury Marquis wagon on the series) which his mother passed down to him, and has put much time and effort into preserving the vehicle. While Al has similar interests such as cars, he has some rather odd interests, such as being able to deduce different types of wood by smell rather than appearance or texture.

Al gets along well with Tim's sons. However, just like Tim, Al has faced problems and needed to seek the advice of Wilson. Outside of his job, Al has made investments such as becoming part owner of Harry's Hardware and marketing a successful board game based on Tool Time, the object of which is to avoid hospitalization.

Al's beard 
Al's beard is also a constant joke by Tim. In one episode where Tool Time is celebrating their fifth anniversary show, Al is shown in the first ever episode of Tool Time clean shaven, while Tim has a beard.

Al's knowledge of tools and home improvement 
He generally knows what he is doing more than Tim, and he seems to have a better knowledge of tools and home improvement than Tim. In the first episode of Tool Time, he was described as a "master plumber" by Tim Taylor. He also is very serious about his job, unlike Tim, who often jokes and messes up the project. Al often speaks fondly of his time as a U.S. Navy Seabee. Although Tim is the one who messes up most of the projects on Tool Time, Al is often the one who is blamed for the mishap, or is injured by the mishap. On rare occasions Al would cause a mishap of his own, but these were more due to overcalculating than Tim's attitude of "more power". Despite this, Tim and Al are good friends offstage, and Al often helps out, either by helping with home projects, or by watching his children.

Romantic relationships 
Al's struggles with relationships were a long-running plot point throughout the series. In season one, Al dated Greta Post, whom he met while she was volunteering to help out during a Tool Time show. Al then showed a brief interest in Jill's friend Karen, whom he met at an impromptu gathering at the Taylor home, but Karen had already accepted a date with another one of Tim's friends. Next, Al went on one date with Tim's ex-girlfriend Stacey Lewis, but had no interest in seeing her again. From seasons three through five, Al went out with Dr. Ilene Markham, an orthodontist and the sister of one of Jill's co-workers. They got engaged, but decided at their wedding to part ways. Al then met a woman named Trudy in season seven and married her in the finale episode in 1999.

Running gags and quirks surrounding Al 
Common recurring jokes throughout the series include Al's beard, his love of bingo, his greater popularity over Tim among Tool Time fans, and his fanatic admiration of fellow home improvement television host Bob Vila. Throughout much of the series, Al often has bad luck with women despite, or possibly because of, his emotional sensitivity, which far exceeds Tim's.

Al's overweight and overbearing mother is also the subject of many jokes, almost exclusively from Tim, such as Tim mentioning her "looking for a smorgasbord".

On the set of Tool Time, Al gives the viewing audience his iconic salute at the start of each airing at his introduction. He is also always wearing flannel on the set and is sometimes shown backstage taking off his shirt and changing into another identical flannel shirt.

Perhaps most well known is Al's catchphrase, "I don't think so, Tim," which Al often says during Tool Time after Tim suggests doing something dangerous or stupid or merely says something that is obviously incorrect or based on wordplay. And when Tim makes a particularly sexist or otherwise offensive remark, Al often holds up a large sign with Tim's mailing address and say, "That's Tim Taylor, care of Tool Time, PO Box 32733, Detroit, Michigan, 48252." Sometimes Tim rips the sign halfway in his sentence, but Al just picks up another sign and finishes.

Dr. Wilson Wilson Jr. 
Dr. Wilson W. Wilson Jr. (Earl Hindman) – Tim's neighbor and confidant. As a child, his parents did not allow him to speak to his neighbors, so he really likes talking to Tim and Jill. Wilson serves as an all-wise sage in the show, doling out advice to the Taylor family and seemingly always knowing just what to say to solve a problem. While most of his appearances were to help the Taylors, on seldom occasion someone who was in the extended family, or a nonmember, such as Al, would seek out Wilson's advice. He has traveled the globe and learned much from virtually every culture in existence. He has a Ph.D. in Cultural Studies, studying "extinct languages and forgotten cultures". His house is full of artifacts along with a pet myna bird named Mozart, who appeared infrequently. Wilson was married at one point, but his wife Catherine died long before the series begins (in a November 1994 episode, Wilson revealed that month would have marked his and Catherine's 25th anniversary).

At first it was unclear whether "Wilson" was his first name or last, but his full name is revealed as Wilson Wilson Wilson Jr. In Season 6, it is revealed that his cousins are the Wilsons of The Beach Boys. He has a grown niece named Willow Wilson (China Kantner), who appeared regularly in the seventh season when she moved in with him for a while. His usual greetings are "Well, hi-dee-ho ..." or "Hi ho, there neighbor" or "good neighbor" when greeting Tim, "neighborette" when greeting Jill, and "Taylor lad(s)" when greeting the Taylor boys.

A visual gag is that throughout the entire series Wilson's face is never shown in its entirety, originally (and most commonly) with the bottom half obscured by the tall privacy fence that separates the neighbors' yards; this was based on how Tim Allen saw a next-door neighbor when he was growing up.  This gag is extended over the course of the series with other objects (or a beard) obscuring the bottom of his face, or the bottom half showing but the top obscured (such as by a mask), or his full face shown but covered by paint. The audience finally sees Earl Hindman's full face unobscured in the series finale's curtain call.

Wilson was mentioned in the Last Man Standing episode "Dual Time" having since passed away (Earl Hindman died in 2003).

Lisa 
Lisa (Pamela Anderson) – Binford's first "Tool Girl." A secondary cast member on Tool Time, Lisa's job was to introduce Tim and Al and to hand them any tool they requested. When Pamela Anderson chose to leave Home Improvement to pursue a role on the syndicated series Baywatch, she was written out of the series after the second season; it was stated that Lisa was training to be a paramedic. Lisa returns for a guest appearance four years later, having become fully qualified; and applies for (and gets) a job at Detroit Memorial Hospital.

Heidi Keppert 
Heidi Keppert (Debbe Dunning) – The second "Tool Girl" (beginning in season 3, series regular in seasons 7–8) and a master electrician. Initially, the character was seen only in and around the Tool Time set. In later seasons, her personal life increasingly crossed paths with Tim and Al. She gave birth to a daughter (Amy) and suffered marital problems during the show's run. In season 8 episode 24 (Dead Weight), Heidi reveals to Tim that her breasts twitch when she is nervous. In the last episode of the series, Heidi revealed she was pregnant for a second time. Despite her credentials, Heidi was also "eye candy" for the male audience on "Tool Time", as the outfits she wore typically showed off her figure, particularly her legs and ample cleavage; Tim speculated that many men came to the show just to see Heidi. It is revealed in multiple episodes that Tim's son, Brad, has a crush on her. In seasons seven and eight, Dunning's role on Tool Time became such that she was eventually given main cast billing in the opening credits.

Harry Turner 
Harry Turner (Blake Clark) – Owner of "Harry's Hardware", where Tim spends a great deal of his time and money, and in which Al eventually became part owner. He is one of Tim and Al's buddies. He is not-so-happily married to his wife Delores (Shirley Prestia), and the couple incessantly bad-mouth one another behind their respective backs, as well as occasionally to each other's face.  Harry has four sons, including Dennis (David DeLuise), with whom he has a somewhat rocky relationship, but they reconciled. In one episode Harry tells Tim that he has gotten a vasectomy (which convinces Tim to get one too). In another episode, he suffered a heart attack while mentioning his service in the United States Marine Corps in the Vietnam War (Blake Clark actually served in Vietnam as an Army officer).

Benny Baroni 
Benny Baroni (Jimmy Labriola) – One of Tim's buddies who hangs out at the hardware store. Benny is a bit of a slacker and notoriously known as a freeloader – his trademark being drinking coffee and eating donuts. Benny has not had a job in years, mainly because he doesn't like to work. He makes money by gambling and betting on horse races. On one episode ("A House Divided", Season 4.18) While the "Tool Time" crew is fixing up Benny's aunt's house, the structure is blown up due to Benny's negligence and is not Tim's fault; furthermore when Tim and his family are moving furniture back into the twice repaired Benny's aunt house, Benny, rather than helping out, lies back on a lawn chair to watch the others do the work. He is also known for being inconsiderate of others; at one point, he even ate at a soup kitchen regularly to avoid paying for meals. 

One episode ("The Look", Season 5.07) Tim was selling season Pistons tickets (Tim had 2 tickets for each game and each pair cost $100) and Benny not able or willing to buy any of the tickets kept offering to go to the games with the people who were buying them, even people he didn't even know, so he could go to the games without paying for a ticket. Ironically in a rare instance of performing earnest work, Benny once appeared on an episode of Tool Time for "Tim and Al's Fantasy Kitchen", where he was shown cutting meat inside a walk-in freezer.

Other recurring characters 
 Karen (Betsy Randle) – a feminist friend of Jill who clashes with Tim over male-female dynamics in relationships. The character moved to California after Season 2, as Randle started her role of Amy Matthews on Boy Meets World, another ABC sitcom.
 Ilene Louise Markham, D.D.S. (Sherry Hursey) – an orthodontist and Al's girlfriend. On their wedding day, she and Al mutually agreed not to get married and ended their romance on a positive note. Her last appearance was in Season 6.
 Marie Morton (Mariangela Pino) – neighbor of the Taylors and friend of Jill. Marie talks about her struggles with her weight and about seeing a therapist. Marie is also encouraging when Jill says she's thinking about going back to school to get her master's degree.
 Joe Morton (Robert Picardo) – Marie's overactive and obnoxious husband; the "meat man" who irritates Tim initially. Morton then locates and buys a hard-to-find jalopy replacement part for Tim. The character ran out on his wife in Season 5 - this coincided with Picardo's taking the role of "The Doctor" on Star Trek: Voyager.
 Jennifer Sudarsky (Jessica Wesson) – Brad's first love interest who always called him "Bradley."
 Angela (Kristen Clayton) – Former girlfriend of Brad, known for being a constant motor-mouth. She dumped Brad for a guy with his own car. Brad suffered from a bout of depression because of this, but eventually rebounded.
 Ashley (Leigh Ann Orsi) – girlfriend of Brad.
 Beth (Anndi McAfee) – Randy's first girlfriend.
 Lauren (Courtney Peldon) – Randy's tomboy girlfriend, left for Costa Rica with him in Season 8.
 Lillian "Nana" Patterson (Polly Holliday) – Jill's mother. Before Lillian's first appearance, she was joked at by Tim as being largely overweight, though in her first appearance, Lillian has become thin again, having used Tim's jokes on Tool Time as motivation. Lillian speaks with a very notable Southwestern accent and is caring and supportive to Jill whenever she has troubles.
 Colonel Fred Patterson (M. Emmet Walsh) – Jill's father, died in his sleep from a heart attack in Season 6. He had a long career in the Army and his favorite movie was Patton. He somewhat got along fine with Tim, but didn't particularly respect him. He never called Tim by his name but instead called him "Hey You".
 Delores Turner (Shirley Prestia) – Harry's overbearing and demanding wife; a New York Knicks fan who can devastate men with "The Look". Her worsening asthma causes Harry to sell the hardware store and move to Arizona in Season 8. Delores and Harry are shown to constantly be arguing whenever they are seen together. Delores is shown several times to work at a local coffee shop as a waitress, where she continues to be sharp-tongued to customers
 Nancy Taylor (Jensen Daggett) – Wife of Marty Taylor. They are separated in Season 8.
 John Binford (Noble Willingham) – founder of Binford Tools, died early in Season 3.
 Maureen "Producer" Binford (Vicki Lewis) – John Binford's overeager and annoying daughter, she ran Tool Time for a brief time during Season 2, constantly reminding Tim in a sing-song voice that she was the Producer of the show, which allowed her to cause many changes to the show that Tim hated.
 Trudy McHale (Megan Cavanagh) – an electrician and heiress to her family's fortune whom Al married in the final episode.
 Cal Borland (Keith Lehman) – Al's brother, a physicist.
 Felix Myman (Al Fann) – professional plumber and frequent participant in Tool Time's projects.
 Rock Flanagan (Casey Sander) – construction worker at K&B Construction. Somewhat loud, and charismatic, Rock always responds to guest appearances on Tool Time by saying, "It's always great to be here, Timmy!" In K&B's "all-tool band", his instrument is a grinder run over an empty oil drum.
 Dwayne Hoover (Gary McGurk) – construction worker at K&B Construction. The "straight man" of K&B, he always has to interrupt Pete whenever he is about to say a story that is too revealing by saying, "This is not the time, nor the place!" In K&B's band, he plays hammers on an anvil.
 Pete Bilker (Mickey Jones) – construction worker at K&B Construction. Whenever he is called by name from Rock, Pete usually responds, "That would be me." In K&B's band, he plays empty plastic fuel cans as drums, using screwdrivers as drumsticks.
 Carrie Patterson (Tudi Roche – the real-life wife of Richard Karn), Jill's sister, a world-traveling photographer.
 Willow Branch Leaf Wilson (China Kantner) – Wilson's laid back niece, just goes by Willow, saying she "pruned it back".
 Lucille Taylor (Bonnie Bartlett) – Tim's widowed mother. She begins to date Tim's old shop teacher in later seasons, causing Tim some discomfort at thinking of his mother in a romantic relationship.
 Bud Harper (Charlie Robinson) – head of Binford Tools, Tim's boss. Bud interacts a lot with Tim and Al, even offering Tim season tickets to the Detroit Pistons. He does not particularly respect Al, even at one point suggesting Al get fired, however Tim defended Al from this.
 Jason (Jarrad Paul) – Eddie Haskell-like friend of Brad, often claims to be a fan of Tool Time even though he's never actually seen the show and gains favor with Tim by pretending to ask for advice about tools.
 Samantha Hayes (Maggie Lawson) – A college student who dated Brad, although she was four years his senior, which troubled Jill and Tim. In one episode, she and Brad impulsively decided to get married at their young age, but Tim and Jill successfully tricked them to realize their mistake.
 Patty (Tammy Lauren) – Jill's friend in season six and seven.
 Morgan Wandell (Danny Zorn) – The new producer of Tool Time during the final season. He is interested only in ratings and is willing to go to any tawdry end to get them, including staging a Jerry Springer Show-like riot in the audience, and wanting Tim to stage more destructive accidents, which Tim is firmly against. Rather than let Wandell turn their show into "Trash Time", Tim, Al, and Heidi quit, but not before turning their final episode into a huge jam session, which became a ratings smash. His job now in jeopardy, Morgan offered Tim a big raise and an executive producer credit to stay on at the show, but Tim refused.
 Milton (Milton Canady) – friend of Tim, often a guest on Tool Time; when he's around, people tend to make gay references, leading to him snapping, "Hey, I don't go for that sort of thing!".
 Art Leonard (Dick O'Neill) – Tim's old shop teacher who inspired him to enter the world of tools. "Mr. Leonard" is initially shown struggling with his fading dexterity. At one point begins dating Tim's mother.
 George Sparky Henderson (Patrick Cronin) – friend of Tim and fellow car enthusiast.
 Antonio (Vasili Bogazianos) – a sarcastic waiter who is always seen serving the Taylors at high-class restaurants; constantly jokes about the Taylors being cheap.
 Alma Borland – Al's unseen, overbearing, obese mother; is the butt of many of Tim's jokes; dies of a sudden heart attack in Season 8 when Al informs her he is going to marry Trudi.
 Ronny (Kaylan Romero) – Mark's goth friend in season 7. Almost never speaks a word and constantly disturbs Tim and Jill with his silent but haunting demeanor.

References 

 
Lists of American sitcom television characters